This is a list of military engagements during the 2022 Russian invasion of Ukraine encompassing land, naval, and air engagements as well as campaigns, operations, defensive lines and sieges. Campaigns generally refer to broader strategic operations conducted over a large territory and over a long period. Battles generally refer to short periods of intense combat localised to a specific area and over a specific period. However, use of the terms in naming such events is not consistent.

Battles

Notable non-battle attacks

See also

 Russo-Ukrainian War
 Timeline of the 2022 Russian invasion of Ukraine
 Order of battle for the 2022 Russian invasion of Ukraine
 Combatants of the war in Donbas
 List of Russian generals killed during the 2022 invasion of Ukraine
 Territorial control during the Russo-Ukrainian War

Notes

References

Russo-Ukrainian War
Military operations of the 2022 Russian invasion of Ukraine

Russian invasion
Lists of armed conflicts in 2022
Lists of battles by war